Harry Goddard (16 November 1885 – 13 May 1925) was an Australian cricketer. He played six first-class matches for New South Wales between 1905/06 and 1910/11.

See also
 List of New South Wales representative cricketers

References

External links
 

1885 births
1925 deaths
Australian cricketers
New South Wales cricketers
Cricketers from Sydney